Manifestif is an album by Loco Locass.

Track listing
"Mes enfants..." 1:15
"L'assaut" 2:07
"Sheila, ch'us là" 4:33
"Langage-toi" 5:33
"L'empire du pire en pire" 4:37
"Malamalangue" 4:45
"Potsotjob" Koubraüss 5:08
"Impression solennel levant" 5:21
"Boom Baby Boom!" 6:22
"Isabeille et Biz" 3:47
"Manifestif" 4:55
"La casse du 24" 2:14
"Priapée la p'tite vite" 2:10
"Médiatribes" 5:39
"Art poétik" 3:46
"I represent rien pantoute" 6:33
"Vulgus vs Sanctus" 5:57

Loco Locass albums
2000 albums
Audiogram (label) albums